David Turnbull (born 10 July 1999) is a Scottish professional footballer who plays as a midfielder for Celtic and the Scotland national team. He began his career at Motherwell, and has won both of the major Young Player of the Year awards (SFWA and PFA).

Club career

Motherwell
Raised in Wishaw where he attended Coltness High School, Turnbull joined the Motherwell Youth Academy in 2009. He was selected for the Scotland football team (represented by North Lanarkshire school pupils) at the 2014 International Children's Games alongside fellow Motherwell player Jake Hastie, who had already been a teammate for several years during their development. On 27 April 2016, Turnbull, Hastie and another long-term academy colleague Allan Campbell were in the Well team that won the Scottish Youth Cup, beating Heart of Midlothian 5–2.

Turnbull made his senior debut for Motherwell on 10 February 2018, in a 2–0 victory away at Dundee in the Scottish Cup. On 8 May 2018, he made his first start and Scottish Professional Football League debut in a 1–0 victory away to Partick Thistle. Later that month he was an unused substitute in the 2018 Scottish Cup Final which Motherwell lost 2–0 to Celtic.

On 31 October 2018, Turnbull scored his first goal for Motherwell against St Mirren. In January 2019, he was the sole goalscorer in two consecutive league wins in the space of four days, at home to Hibernian and away to Dundee. A few days later he signed a new contract with Motherwell, running until summer 2021. In May 2019, amid more goals and growing media praise for his performances, he was nominated for the season's PFA Scotland Young Player of the Year, along with Jake Hastie; the award was won by Ryan Kent. Turnbull won the SFWA Young Player of the Year award for 2018–19, voted for by Scottish football journalists. He was the first Motherwell player to win that award since James McFadden in 2001–02.

In June 2019, Motherwell agreed a club-record £3.25 million fee with Celtic for Turnbull. The proposed deal collapsed when medical tests found that Turnbull would require preventative surgery on his left knee, and the clubs could not agree revised terms. Turnbull returned to Motherwell, had his knee operation – performed by renowned London surgeon Andy Williams – then underwent a rehabilitation programme across the winter (alongside teammate Charles Dunne who was recovering from a groin injury) and resumed full training in February 2020. His mental and physical recovery was chartered in a behind-the-scenes club documentary which followed him from the day of his collapsed move through operations, rehabilitation and to his eventual return to first-team action. He made his return to the first team as a second half substitute at home to St Mirren on 25 February. On 11 March 2020, Turnbull signed a contract extension with Motherwell to run until 2022. With the 2019–20 season halted days afterwards due to the COVID-19 pandemic in Scotland, he successfully re-established himself as an important member of the side at the outset of 2020–21.

Celtic
Turnbull joined Celtic on 27 August 2020, on a four-year deal. The fee of around £3 million was a club record for Motherwell. 

After three substitute appearances during September, he made his first start for the club on 4 October against St Johnstone. While there was initially few opportunities in the early part of the season, on 10 December 2020 Turnbull started in a UEFA Europa League home fixture against Ligue 1 side Lille OSC. He scored his first goal for Celtic and made an assist for Christopher Jullien in a 3–2 win against the French champions, which was the final group stage match for Celtic that season. His subsequent form in the Scottish Premiership would see him awarded with the SPFL Player of the Month for December. Turnbull would go on to finish the 2020-21 season with ten goals and win the PFA Scotland Young Player of the Year award, proving to be a shining light for Celtic in an otherwise disappointing campaign where they lost the Premiership title and failed to win a trophy.

Under new Celtic manager Ange Postecoglou, Turnbull played regularly in the first half of the 2021-22 season. On 12 August 2021, he scored a double in a 3–0 (agg 7–2) UEFA Europa League play-off win against Czech First League side FK Jablonec. Later that month, he would also score a hat-trick in a 6–0 victory against St Mirren in the Scottish Premiership. Turnbull featured as a starter in the 2021–22 Scottish League Cup final but was forced off with a hamstring injury after only playing 27 minutes. However, Celtic would defeat Hibernian 2–1 and Turnbull collected his League Cup winner's medal.

On 3 September 2022, Turnbull scored in a 4–0 win against Rangers - taking advantage of an error from Jon McLaughlin.

International career
Turnbull has played at under-16, under-19 and under-20 level for Scotland. He made his debut for the under-21 team in March 2019. He was added to the full national squad for the first time in May 2021, ahead of the delayed UEFA Euro 2020 tournament. He made his debut on 2 June 2021 in a friendly against Netherlands, as a starter. He was selected in the squad for the Euro finals, but did not make an appearance.

Career statistics

Honours
 Motherwell
Scottish Youth Cup: 2015–16

Celtic
Scottish Premiership: 2021–22
Scottish Cup: 2019–20
Scottish League Cup: 2021–22, 2022–23

Individual
SFWA Young Player of the Year: 2018–19
PFAS Young Player of the Year: 2020–21
PFA Scotland Team of the Year: 2020–21
MFC Fans' Player of the Year: 2018–19
Motherwell Players' Player of the Year: 2018–19
Motherwell Young Player of the Year: 2018–19
Motherwell Goal of the Season: 2018–19
Celtic FC Player of the Year: 2020–21
Celtic FC Young Player of the Year: 2020–21
Evening Times Celtic Player of the Year: 2020–21
SPFL Premiership Player of the Month: December 2020

References

1999 births
Living people
People from Carluke
Sportspeople from Wishaw
Scottish footballers
Association football midfielders
Scotland youth international footballers
Scotland under-21 international footballers
Scotland international footballers
Motherwell F.C. players
Celtic F.C. players
Scottish Professional Football League players
UEFA Euro 2020 players
People educated at Coltness High School
Footballers from North Lanarkshire